The 2013 AFC U-19 Women's Championship qualification was a women's under-19 football competition which decided final participating team of the 2013 AFC U-19 Women's Championship.

Only one team qualified to play in the final tournament, including South Korea, North Korea, China PR, Australia, and Japan, who qualified directly as the top 5 finishers of the 2011 AFC U-19 Women's Championship.

The top three teams of the final tournament qualified for the 2014 FIFA U-20 Women's World Cup in Canada.

Competition format 

The competition format of the qualification is as follows:

Seeding
The sixth and the seventh placed teams in the previous edition ( and ) received byes for the second qualification round.
First qualification round
12 teams are divided into three groups of four, where each group plays a single round-robin tournament. Top two teams in each group (total 6 teams) will advance to the second qualification round. Two of the three groups are consisted of central, south and west Asian teams (8 teams), while the other group consists of east and southeast Asian teams (4 teams).
Second qualification round
The six teams from the first qualification round and the two teams received the byes are divided into two groups of four, where each group plays a single round-robin tournament. Group winners in the groups will play a play-off match where the winner will qualify for the final tournament.

The draw for the first and the second qualification round is conducted in March 2012 at the AFC House in Kuala Lumpur, Malaysia.

If two or more teams are equal on points on completion of the group matches, the following criteria were applied to determine the rankings.
 Greater number of points obtained in the group matches between the teams concerned;
 Goal difference resulting from the group matches between the teams concerned;
 Greater number of goals scored in the group matches between the teams concerned;
 Goal difference in all the group matches;
 Greater number of goals scored in all the group matches;
 Kicks from the penalty mark if only two teams are involved and they are both on the field of play;
 Fewer score calculated according to the number of yellow and red cards received in the group matches;
 Drawing of lots.

First round
Top two teams of each group will advance to the Second round.

Group A
All matches are held in Malacca, Malaysia (UTC+8).

 withdrew before playing any match.

Group B
All matches are held in Amman, Jordan (UTC+2).

Group C
All matches are held in Manila, Philippines (UTC+8).

Second round
Top two teams of each group in first qualification round would join Thailand and Vietnam in the second round. Group winners in the groups would play a play-off match where the winner will qualify for the final tournament.

All matches were held in Ho Chi Minh City, Vietnam (UTC+7).

Qualified teams

Group A

Group B

Play-off

Myanmar qualified for the final tournament.

References

External links
Official site

AFC U-19 Women's Championship qualification
Qual
qualification
Afc
2012 in youth sport